Caulerpa lagara is a species of seaweed in the Caulerpaceae family.

The seaweed is found around Perth in Western Australia.

References

lagara
Species described in 1993